Samuel Janus (born 1930) was an American psychotherapist and author who specializes in investigating the sexual exploitation of children.

Bibliography
 The Death of Innocence - how our children are endangered by the new sexual freedom. William Morrow and Co, New York, 1981, 
 A Sexual Profile of Men in Power. Prentice Hall, 1977, 978-0138074876
 The Janus Report on Sexual Behaviour, Samuel Janus and Cynthia Janus, 1993. James Wiley and Sons

External links
 Analyzing Jewish Comics - Time Magazine

1930 births
American male writers
Living people